Unciella flagrantis is a species of moth in the family Noctuidae (the owlet moths). It is found in North America.

The MONA or Hodges number for Unciella flagrantis is 10112.

References

Further reading

External links 

 

Amphipyrinae
Articles created by Qbugbot
Moths described in 1893